Goal  is a 2007 Indian Malayalam-language film directed by Kamal. The film stars newcomers Rejith Menon and a Mumbai based Model Aksha Pardasany and Mukta George.

Cast
 Rejith Menon as Sam
 Aksha Pardasany as Neethu
 Muktha George as Mariya
 Mukesh as Isaac,  Sam's Dad
 Rahman as Vijay
 Salim Kumar as Kuriakose
Jagadeesh as Sreekumar
 Viplove Patel as Felix
 Sangeeth
 Mridula
 Job Kurian
 Kunchan
 Ambika Mohan
 Poornima Anand
 Bindu Murali
 Vigneashwar.R as guy who throws egg on the villain

Soundtrack

The soundtracks for the movie is composed by Vidyasagar while the lyrics are written by Gireesh Puthenchery and Sharath Vayalar.

Reception 
A critic from Rediff.com wrote that "To sum up, Kamal's effort to score this Goal misses the post by a few yards".

References

External links
 

2007 films
Indian sports comedy-drama films
2000s Malayalam-language films
2007 romantic comedy-drama films
Indian association football films
2000s sports comedy-drama films
Films shot in Ooty
Films scored by Vidyasagar
Indian romantic comedy-drama films
Films directed by Kamal (director)